The names Sallustius/Saloustios and their vernacular variants Sallust(e) have been borne by many people:
 Sallust or Gaius Sallustius Crispus, historian of the 1st century BC
Gardens of Sallust
 Gaius Sallustius Passienus Crispus, 1st-century AD Roman notable
 Sallustius Lucullus, 1st-century AD governor of Roman Britain
 Seius Sallustius, 3rd-century usurper
 Sallustius (Neoplatonist), a writer who might be the same as either:
 Flavius Sallustius, 4th-century Hispano-Roman statesman, consul and praetorian prefect of Gaul
 Saturninus Secundus Salutius, 4th-century Gallo-Roman statesman, praetorian prefect of the Orient
 Sallustius of Emesa, 5th-century Cynic philosopher
 Guillaume de Salluste Du Bartas, 16th-century French Protestant epic poet
 Salluste Duval, 19th-century Canadian inventor

See also
 Sallust (horse), (1969-87), thoroughbred racehorse